AlGa (Aluminum-Gallium) is a degenerate alloy that results from liquid gallium infiltrating the crystal structure of aluminium metal. The resulting alloy is very weak and brittle, being broken under the most minute pressure. The alloy is also chemically weaker, as the gallium inhibits the aluminum from forming a protective oxide layer.

Uses
The alloy can be reacted with water to form hydrogen gas, aluminum oxide and gallium metal. Normally, aluminum does not react with water, since it instantly reacts in air to form a passivation layer of aluminum oxide. AlGa is able to create aluminum nanoparticles for the hydrogen producing reaction.

Safety concerns

Due to AlGa's extreme lack of structural integrity and inability to form a protective oxide layer, gallium metal is considered to be corrosive. If AlGa were to form on an aluminum structure, the aforementioned structure could weaken or collapse. Gallium is illegal to transport on aircraft as it could compromise the integrity of the aluminum hull.

References

Aluminium alloys
Gallium alloys